William Heath "Kanaka" Davis, Jr. (1822 – 1909) was a merchant and trader in Alta California who helped to establish "New Town" (now Downtown San Diego) in San Diego, California.

Life
Davis was born in 1822 in Honolulu in the Kingdom of Hawaii to Captain William Heath Davis, Sr., a Boston ship captain and pioneer of the Hawaii sandalwood trade, and Hannah Holmes Davis (1800-1847), a daughter of Oliver Holmes, Governors of Oahu. His nickname "Kanaka" refers to Davis's Hawaiian birth and blood; he was one-quarter Hawaiian from his maternal grandmother Mahi Kalanihooulumokuikekai, a high chiefess from the Koolau district of Oahu. His elder brother Robert Grimes Davis was a Hawaiian judge and politician.

Davis first visited California as a boy in 1831, then again in 1833 and 1838.  The last time, he joined his uncle as a store clerk in Monterey and Yerba Buena (now San Francisco). He started a business in San Francisco and became a prominent merchant and ship owner.

In 1847 Davis married María de Jesus, daughter of José Joaquin Estudillo, grantee of Rancho San Leandro, and granddaughter of José María Estudillo. The Davises had at least one daughter, Anna Maria, born c. 1849. About the same time he moved to San Diego, which became part of the United States in 1850 via the admission of California to the union.

Davis was the original founder of New Town San Diego, an attempt to build a new community closer to San Diego Bay than the original Old Town San Diego, which was located below the Presidio of San Diego more than a mile from navigable water. The idea for New Town had originated with Lt. Andrew B. Gray, an American surveyor with the boundary commission which laid out the borders and boundaries of the new state of California. Gray's party camped near what is now H Street and he realized that this location near the natural harbor would be a much better location for a city. Davis agreed and recruited José Antonio Aguirre, Miguel Pedrorena, and William C. Ferrell as additional partners in the venture. The partners bought 160 acres of land and laid out streets, a large wharf, and a warehouse. The local residents referred to the project as New Town, Graytown (after Lt. Gray), and "Davis's Folly". The venture did not do well due to a lack of fresh water and hostility from the established settlements at Old Town and La Playa, although the U.S. Army maintained a facility in the area for a time, eventually abandoning it during the American Civil War. Later, in 1867, the idea was revived by Alonzo Horton, who built a new subdivision just to the east of Davis's plot, which became a success. The area is now Downtown San Diego, while the site of the original settlement is still referred to as Old Town.

Davis later wrote a memoir which was of great value to historians in understanding the early years of California and San Diego.

Davis eventually settled in San Leandro in financial straits. He died in Hayward, California on April 19, 1909.

Legacy

The oldest building in New Town is the William Heath Davis House, a pre-fab "saltbox"-style home shipped from the east coast and built in 1850.  It wasn't Davis's house, but of the same style and age of the Davis home that was on State and F Streets. The house is open to the public today as a museum at 410 Island Ave.

The original plaza for New Town is now today's Horton Plaza, but New Town Plaza, which still exists and is bounded by F, G, Columbia, and India Streets.

Notes

External links

 William Heath Davis papers, MSS 4026 at L. Tom Perry Special Collections, Harold B. Lee Library, Brigham Young University
 William Heath Davis correspondence, MSS SC 1344 at L. Tom Perry Special Collections, Harold B. Lee Library, Brigham Young University

Further reading
 Sixty Years in California (1889) by William Heath Davis (free ebook online at Internet Archive)
 Seventy-Five Years in California (1929) by William Heath Davis (Douglas S. Watson and John Howell, editors).
 An American in California: The Biography of William Heath Davis, 1822-1909 (Huntington Library, 1956) by Andrew Rolle
 "Dream of Glory (William Heath Davis)", The Journal of San Diego History 13:2 (1967). * Reprints Davis interview from San Diego Daily Sun December 19, 1887.
 Guide to the William Heath Davis Papers at The Bancroft Library

1822 births
1909 deaths
History of San Diego
People from Honolulu
People of Native Hawaiian descent
People of Mexican California